Ion Șiclovan (7 May 1921 – 22 May 1985) was a Romanian footballer who played as a midfielder. On 21 November 1948 he played in the first ever CSCA București – Dinamo București derby. After ending his playing career, Șiclovan first worked at FRF, later he was a rector at the National University of Physical Education and Sport from Bucharest and he also became a writer.

International career
Ion Șiclovan played four games at international level for Romania, including a 3–2 victory against Bulgaria at the 1947 Balkan Cup.

Writing
He wrote two volumes, both of them being about sport:
 Teoria antrenamentului sportiv (The sports training theory) (1977)
 Teoria educatiei fizice si sportului (The theory of physical education and sport) (1979)

Notes

References

External links
Ion Șiclovan at Labtof.ro

1921 births
1985 deaths
Romanian footballers
Romania international footballers
Association football midfielders
Liga I players
Liga II players
FC Carmen București players
FC Dinamo București players
Romanian writers
20th-century Romanian writers
Romanian male writers
20th-century Romanian male writers
Sportspeople from Arad, Romania